Galtay is a rural locality (a selo) in Mukhorshibirsky District, Republic of Buryatia, Russia. The population was 446 as of 2010. There are 9 streets.

Geography 
Galtay is located 48 km north of Mukhorshibir (the district's administrative centre) by road. Kalinovka is the nearest rural locality.

References 

Rural localities in Mukhorshibirsky District